Dungeon! is a 1982 video game adaptation of the board game Dungeon!

Publication history
In 1982, the board game Dungeon! was adapted as a video game for the Apple II.

Reception
The Apple II version of Dungeon! was well received, gaining a Certificate of Merit in the category of "1984 Best Multi-Player Video Game/Computer Game" at the 5th annual Arkie Awards.

Reviews
Fantasy Gamer #1

References

External links
Review in Softalk
Review in Electronic Games

1982 video games
Apple II games
Apple II-only games
Dungeon crawler video games
Single-player video games
Video games based on board games
Video games developed in the United States